Hydrocotyle vulgaris, the marsh pennywort, common pennywort, water naval, money plant, lucky plant or copper coin, is a small creeping aquatic perennial plant native to North Africa, Europe, the Caucasus and parts of the Levant.

Description

The plant has an umbrella-like leaf and lives commonly in wet places such as wetlands, marshes and swamps, sometimes even in deeper water. It grows as a perennial herbaceous plant and only reaches stature heights of 5 to 20 centimeters. With a slight smell of carrot, it is edible.

This marsh plant forms numerous, up to 1 meter long, creeping offshoots. The serrated, rounded, shield-shaped leaves can have a diameter of up to 4 centimeters, but are often smaller. The approach of the long, hairy petioles is located in the middle of the leaf underside. The leaves are fresh green, shiny waxy and shows a clear, radially extending vein.

The tiny, inconspicuous, hermaphrodite flowers are in low-flowered doldigen inflorescences or whorls, with the stems of the inflorescence about half as long as those of the leaves. The petals are greenish, white or reddish. The flowering period is from July to August. The fruits are flat, warty and winged.

Cultivation
A low maintenance plant, it prefers to grow in reliably moist humus under a full sun or in part shade, indoors or outdoors, though it can tolerate full shade as well. It may also be grown as an aquatic plant in mud at the side of a pond or water garden in up to 2 inches of stagnant water. Despite its habitat in water, over-watering may still cause root rot.

Population
The plant is distributed and plentiful throughout much of its range in Europe, North Africa and Western Asia. Nonetheless, it is classed as critically endangered in Croatia, vulnerable in Switzerland and near threatened in Norway. Furthermore, the plant is protected under regional legislation in France.

Ecology
In Britain it is the only native Hydrocotyle, growing in wet places such as fens, swamps, bogs and marshes. For example, it is a component of purple moor grass and rush pastures – a type of Biodiversity Action Plan habitat. The flowers rarely bloom; mostly self-pollination takes place. Vegetative propagation occurs through foothills. In wild plant gardens, the marsh pennywort is used for the planting of garden ponds, and also as aquarium plant.

Gallery

See also
Umbilicus rupestris, a similar looking succulent
Pilea peperomioides, a similar looking rosales

References

External links

 Wildflower.org.uk website giving photographic description of the plant

vulgaris
Flora of Asia
Flora of Europe
Flora of North Africa
Plants described in 1753
Taxa named by Carl Linnaeus